Majcher is a surname and a given name, a vernacular form of "Melchior". Variants: Maycher, Maicher. Notable people with this name include:

 (born 1962), Polish stage and film actress 
Helena Pilejczyk née Majcher (born 1931), Polish speed skater
Joseph Majcher (born 1960), Polish-born Canadian soccer player
Stanisław Majcher (1936–2014), Polish soccer player

See also

References

Masculine given names
Polish-language surnames